Santa María d'a Penya or Santa María is a locality located in the municipality of Las Peñas de Riglos, in Huesca province, Aragon, Spain. As of 2020, it has a population of 20.

Geography 
Santa María d'a Penya is located 48km northwest of Huesca.

References

Populated places in the Province of Huesca